The Basketball Champions League Final Four (BCL Final Four) is the concluding final four tournament of each season's Basketball Champions League. The tournament's full official name is FIBA Basketball Champions League Final Four. The BCL is an international professional basketball competition that is contested by European basketball clubs, and which is organized by the Basketball Champions League S.A., in conjunction with FIBA. 

The final fours are hosted by one of the final four teams.

History
The very first BCL Final Four, the 2017 Basketball Champions League Final Four, was held from 28 April to 30 April, 2017.

During the 2019–20 season, due to the COVID-19 pandemic and the following suspension of the league, the usual format of a Final Four was changed to a Final Eight.

Results

Arenas

Final Four MVP

References

External links
Basketball Champions League (official website)
FIBA Europe (official website)
Eurobasket.com League Page
Basketball Champions League Official YouTube Account

Final Four